Diary of a Pig War (Spanish: La Guerra del cerdo) is a 1975 Argentinian film directed by Leopoldo Torre Nilsson about his own script written in collaboration with Beatriz Guido and Luis Pico Estrada. It is based on the novel "Diario de la guerra del cerdo" by Adolfo Bioy Casares. It stars José Slavin, Marta González, Edgardo Suárez, Víctor Laplace and Emilio Alfaro. It was released on 7 August, 1975. Excerpts of the short film The Last Cry (1960) by Dino Minitti are seen during the film.

Plot

In an alternative reality, a man who is entering old age faces a society in which the young eliminate the old.

Cast

 José Slavin …Isidro Vidal
 Marta González …Nélida
 Edgardo Suárez … Antonio Bobliolo
 Víctor Laplace … Isidorito Vidal
 Emilio Alfaro … Farrell
 Osvaldo Terranova … Leandro Rey
 Miguel Ligero...	Jimmy Neuman
 Luis Politti
 Zelmar Gueñol
 María José Demare
 Héctor Tealdi
 Adriana Parets
 Raquel María Álvarez
 Walter Soubrié
 Marta Cipriano
 Fernando Tacholas Iglesias
 Luis Cordara
 Cristina Aramburu
 Matilde Mur
 Augusto Larreta
 Juan Carlos Gianuzzi
 Alberto Salgado
 Inés Murray
 Marcelo Alfaro
 Julio César Acera
 Franco Balestrieri
 Alberto Fernández de Rosa 
 Cecilia Cenci

External links
 

1975 films
Argentine drama films
1970s Spanish-language films
1970s Argentine films